Lindstedt may refer to:

 Lindstedt (Gardelegen), a district of Gardelegen in Germany
 , a castle in Brandenburg in Germany

Lindstedt is the name of:
 Anders Lindstedt (1854–1939), Swedish mathematician and astronomer
 Carl-Gustaf Lindstedt (1921–1992), Swedish actor
  (1929–2008), German author and journalist
  (born 1936)
 Pierre Lindstedt (born 1943), Swedish actor
 Jouko Lindstedt (born 1955), Finnish linguist
 Annica Lindstedt (born 1976), Swedish former professional tennis player
 Laura Lindstedt (born 1976), Finnish writer
 Robert Lindstedt (born 1977), Swedish tennis player
 Rosa Lindstedt (born 1988), Finnish ice hockey player
 Oskar Lindstedt (born 1993), Swedish ice hockey defenceman